The 1968–69 Idaho State Bengals men's basketball team represented Idaho State University during the  NCAA University Division basketball season. Led by second-year head coach Dan Miller, the Bengals played their home games on campus at Reed Gym in Pocatello.

The ISU Minidome became the new home court two seasons later, in the fall of 1970.

References

External links
Sports Reference – Idaho State Bengals – 1968–69 basketball season
Idaho State Bengals men's basketball – Year by year results

Idaho State
Idaho State Bengals men's basketball seasons
Idaho State Basketball, Men's
Idaho State Basketball, Men's